Raisdorf is a former municipality in the district of Plön, in Schleswig-Holstein, Germany. It is situated approximately 9 km southeast of Kiel. Until 2003 it was twinned with Uttoxeter, United Kingdom. On 1 March 2008, it was merged with Klausdorf to form the town Schwentinental.

Villages in Schleswig-Holstein
Former municipalities in Schleswig-Holstein